Agios Mamas may refer to:

 Agios Mamas, Chalkidiki, Greece
 Agios Mamas, Limassol, Cyprus